The boys' singles of the tournament 2022 BWF World Junior Championships is an individual badminton tournament to crowned the best boys' singles under 19 player across the BWF associate members around the world. Players will compete to win the Eye Level Cup presented by the former BWF President and chairman of the World Youth Culture Foundation, Kang Young Joong. The tournament will be held from 24 to 30 October 2022 in the Palacio de Deportes de Santander, Spain. The defending champion was Kunlavut Vitidsarn from Thailand, but he was not eligible to participate this year.

Seeds 

  Alex Lanier (quarter-finals)
  Alwi Farhan (second round)
  Justin Hoh (fourth round)
  Sankar Subramanian (final)
  Tauri Kilk (third round)
  Victor Lai (first round)
  Sanjeevi Padmanabhan Vasudevan (third round)
  Charles Fouyn (second round)

  Yeison del Cid (first round)
  Karim Krehemeier (first round)
  Bodhi Ratana Teja Gotama (fourth round)
  Luca Zhou (third round)
  Jakob Houe (third round)
  Christian Faust Kjær (third round)
  Noah Haase (second round)
  Alessandro Gozzini (second round)

Draw

Finals

Top half

Section 1

Section 2

Section 3

Section 4

Bottom half

Section 5

Section 6

Section 7

Section 8

References

External links 
Draw

2022 BWF World Junior Championships